Tapinanthus rubromarginatus, commonly known as red mistletoe, is a species of plant in the family Loranthaceae. The leaf margins are red as reflected by the specific name rubro-, meaning "red", and marginatus meaning "margin".

Range and hosts
It is native to northern South Africa, northwards of the Vaal and Pongola Rivers, and to the uplands of western and northern Eswatini. The host plants include Protea caffra, Protea roupelliae and Faurea saligna.

Description

This is a deciduous, semi-parasitic aerial shrub, that attaches itself to the host plant by haustoria. 
The leaves are clustered in groups, and have narrow, dark red edges. The pinkish red flowers appear in spring, and the berries are similarly coloured.

Reproduction
Sunbirds are attracted by the flower nectar and perform most of the pollination. The pistil and anthers make contact with the sunbird's crown feathers, as it probes the perianth tube. Several species of birds eat the sweet fruit, the seeds of which are coated with a thick, sticky glue. This glue sticks to the beak, and is wiped off on another branch, where the seed is deposited and eventually germinates.

References

rubromarginatus
Taxa named by Adolf Engler
Flora of Africa